Gregory Kean Williams (born September 27, 1962) is a Canadian television actor. He is perhaps best known for his role as Clancy Lass in the television series Dead Like Me.

Early life
Kean was born in Oshawa, Ontario, the son of Dorothy and Rex Williams. He earned an M.F.A. from Cornell University.

Career
His first acting role was either a dancing rabbit named "Nibbles" in a grade 5 presentation of the operetta "Snow White and the Seven Dwarfs" or as another bunny in an Easter play, both at Adelaide McLaughlin Public School in Oshawa, Ontario in 1973.

As a stage actor, Greg has been a resident company member of the Alley Theatre in Houston, Texas. He also has worked with the Los Angeles Theater Centre and the New Mexico Rep as well as the first Actors' Equity Association sanctioned production of Tony n' Tina's Wedding in Los Angeles. Greg is also an acting teacher and one of the owners of the William Davis Centre for Actors Study in Vancouver, British Columbia along with Dead Like Me colleague Christine Willes. Mr. Kean is currently teaching drama at Southpointe Academy, a private school located in Tsawwassen, British Columbia, Canada.

Filmography

Films
 Summer Dreams: The Story of the Beach Boys (1990), Brian Wilson
 Baby of the Bride (1991), Nick
 Mother of the Bride (1993), Nick
 Logan's War: Bound by Honor (1998)

Television
 Saved by the Bell (1990), Adam Trask
 The Chris Isaak Show (2001), Lou
 Andromeda (2002)
 Dead Like Me (2003–2004), Clancy Lass
 Smallville (2004)
 The Dead Zone (2005)
 Black Christmas (2006), Kelli's Father
 Legends of Tomorrow (2021), Bert Beeman

References

External links
 

1962 births
Canadian male film actors
Canadian male television actors
Cornell University alumni
Living people
Male actors from Oshawa